Zetela semisculpta is a species of sea snail, a marine gastropod mollusk, in the family Solariellidae.

Description
(described as Spectamen semisculptum) The height of the shell attains 3.1 mm, its diameter 4.6 mm. The thin, white shell has a depressed turbinate shape with a wide umbilicus. The acute spire is conoid. It contains 4 convex whorls. The suture is distinct, and not channeled. The umbilicus is funnel-shaped. The rounded aperture is slightly oblique. The peristome is thin, outer margin very colunellari slightly arched. The outer lip is pronounced. The columella is slightly arched.

Distribution
This marine species occurs in the Indian Ocean off KwaZulu-Natal and the Agulhas Bank, Rep. South Africa

References

External links
 To World Register of Marine Species

Solariellidae
Gastropods described in 1904